The Department for International Trade (DIT) was a department of His Majesty's Government responsible for striking and extending trade agreements between the United Kingdom and foreign countries, as well as for encouraging foreign investment and export trade. 

DIT's purpose was to develop, coordinate and deliver a new trade policy for the United Kingdom, including preparing for and then negotiating free trade agreements and market access deals with non-EU countries. 

The final Secretary of State for International Trade, was Kemi Badenoch. On 7 February 2023, the department was merged in a reshuffle with parts of the former Department for Business, Energy and Industrial Strategy to form the new Department of Business and Trade. Badenoch became Secretary of State for Business and Trade.

History

The department was created by former Prime Minister Theresa May, shortly after she took office on 13 July 2016, following the United Kingdom's vote to leave the European Union. It took on the responsibilities of UK Trade & Investment, which was previously operated by both the Foreign Office and the Department for Business, Innovation and Skills; it also took on the latter's other relevant trade functions, as well as responsibility for UK Export Finance. In doing so, the department can trace its institutional history back to the longstanding Department of Trade and Industry (1970-2007), itself formed from a merger of the Board of Trade with the short-lived Ministry of Technology in 1970.

The Board of Trade was the government body, arising from the Privy Council with historic responsibility for British commerce and industry. When the UK joined the European Economic Community in 1973, the Board lost most of its powers and responsibilities, which had become a competencies of the EEC, later the European Union. Nevertheless, the Board persisted as a dormant institution whose presidency remained a subsidiary title of the Secretary of State with responsibilities for trade. In 2017 the Board was reconstituted as an advisory body, designed to engage with the whole of the UK on the UK’s global trade and investment agenda, with a focus on promoting the UK regions as destinations to trade and do business with. The Board's president remains the Secretary of State for International Trade, who by virtue of their membership of the Privy Council, is the only member. Advisors to the Board include industry leaders, academics, junior ministers in the Department for International Trade, and the Secretaries of State for Scotland, Wales, and Northern Ireland. The reports of the Board of Trade are an important form of policy direction for the Department for International Trade.

By February 2017, the department employed about 200 trade negotiators.

The department was dissolved on 7 February 2023, and its functions and personnel transferred to the new Department for Business and Trade.

Ministers

The final roster of Ministers in the Department for International Trade were as follows:

The role of Minister of State for International Trade was downgraded, soon after Rishi Sunak became Prime Minister in October 2022, to the more junior rank of Parliamentary Under-Secretary. At the same time, Kemi Badenoch's assumption of the role of Minister for Women and Equalities saw the appointment of two additional Parliamentary Under-Secretaries to support this additional portfolio. Badenoch retained the portfolio for Women and Equalities when the department was dissolved and merged.

Trade remedies
After Britain left the EU, the Trade Remedies Investigations Directorate (TRID) of the Department for International Trade was created to investigate whether new trade remedies are needed to prevent injury to UK industries caused by unfair trading practices and unforeseen surges in imports. These remedies usually take the form of additional duties on those imports.

Following Royal Assent of the Trade Act 2021 TRID became an independent arms-length body, the Trade Remedies Authority (TRA), on 1 June 2021. The Authority is based in Reading.

See also
Asia Task Force
Department for Business and Trade.

References

External links
Department for International Trade Official Website
Trade Remedies Authority
History of Nos. 3-8, Whitehall Place

 
2016 establishments in the United Kingdom
Government agencies established in 2016
Ministries established in 2016
Trade in the United Kingdom
Trade ministries
2023 disestablishments in the United Kingdom
Government agencies disestablished in the 2020s